Takashi Uchino is the name of:

Takashi Uchino (footballer, born 1988), Japanese footballer
Takashi Uchino (footballer, born 2001), Japanese footballer